Wangsimni Station is a station on Seoul Subway Line 2, Seoul Subway Line 5,  Gyeongui–Jungang Line, and Suin-Bundang Line; most Suin-Bundang Line trains end service here, though a few daily services continue along the tracks used by the Gyeonggi-Jungang line to terminate at the next station, Cheongnyangni in northeastern Seoul. It is located in Haengdang-dong, Seongdong-gu, Seoul.

The name of the station, "Wangsimni", is related to a historical account dating from 14th century Korea. After establishing and becoming the first king of the Joseon dynasty, Yi Seong-gye presented the great Buddhist monk Muhak with the task of finding a site for the new capital. After searching for a suitable place, the monk stopped and saw an old farmer passing by on his ox. The farmer pointed toward the northwest and said to him, wangsimni (往十里), literally meaning 'go ten more li (li = a unit measure that equals to one-third of a mile).' The startled Muhak went to the northwest as he was told and ended up at the southern foot of Mt. Bugak, where Gyeongbokgung now stands. This was how Hanyang (present-day Seoul) was born.

Station layout

Korail Lines

Line 2

Line 5

Bitplex
In September 2008, Wangsimni station was remodeled to a private invested station. This station became multiplex space with several major features down below.
 CGV IMAX: movie theater with the largest IMAX screen in South Korea
 Four Season: The only downtown water park in Seoul
 Enter 6: The largest clothing shopping mall in South Korea
 Emart
 Dome Golf: indoor golf zone

Surroundings
 Hanyang University / Hanyang Women's College
 Salgoji Park
 Seongdong-gu office
 Enter 6

References

External links
 Station information from Korail

Seoul Metropolitan Subway stations
Metro stations in Seongdong District
Railway stations opened in 1983
Railway stations in Seoul
Gyeongwon Line
Gyeongui–Jungang Line
Bundang Line
Seoul Subway Line 2
Seoul Subway Line 5
1983 establishments in South Korea
20th-century architecture in South Korea